Dada Thakur (also Dadathakur) is a 1962 Bengali biographical film directed by Sudhir Mukherjee. It is based on the life of publisher, editor and satirist Sarat Chandra Pandit (popularly known as Dada Thakur), starring Chhabi Biswas in the title role. At the 10th National Film Awards, it won the National Film Award for Best Feature Film.

Plot
The film is based closely on the life of the real-life Dada Thakur, and was made in his lifetime. Dada Thakur (Chhabi Biswas) starts his career with a hand-operated press, with his wife (Chhaya Devi) as his assistant. Later he is joined by Nalini Kanta Sarkar (Tarun Kumar), an underground freedom-fighter. Dada Thakur brings out the newspaper Jangipur Sangbad. He campaigns against social evils and earns the ire of the ruling classes. He saves a girl, Lata (Sulata Chowdhury), from the unwanted advances of Darpanarayan (Biswajit Chatterjee), scion of the local zamindar. Lata joins the ranks of freedom fighters working with Sarkar. Subsequently, a reformed Darpanarayan too becomes an ardent follower of Dada Thakur and joins the struggle for India's freedom.  Dada Thakur's greatest success is when he helps an ordinary man, a petty shopkeeper, to get elected as the Municipal Commissioner of Jangipur. 

Later, Dada Thakur has to close down Jangipur Sangbad but soon starts another publication Bidushak. While hawking the journal on the streets of Calcutta, the British police charge at him. However, he is rescued by Subhash Chandra Bose, the then mayor of Calcutta. 

The film ends on a tragic note when Dada Thakur witnesses the killing of Darpanarayan by the British. His death brings tears in the eyes of Dada Thakur for the first time. He prays in agony that the soil of Bengal may produce more such devoted young fighters, for ultimate victory is to be achieved through their efforts.

Cast
 Chhabi Biswas as Dada Thakur
 Biswajit Chatterjee as Darpanarayan
 Chhaya Devi as Dada Thakur's wife
 Tarun Kumar as Nalini Kanta Sarkar
 Sulata Chowdhury as Lata
 Bhanu Bandyopadhyay

Crew 
 Direction - Sudhir Mukherjee
 Production - Shyamlal Jalan
 Music - Hemanta Mukherjee
 Audiography - Satyen Chatterjee

Production
The casting of the film was done in 1957. Biswajit, who made his debut with this film, recalls: "There was a family like atmosphere prevailing in the entire unit then. I fondly recollect one night when I was having disturbance in sleeping due to mosquito bites. We were shooting outdoors. Chhabi Biswas, like a parent figure, took care personally putting up a mosquito net and covered me with a blanket."

Reception
When released, the film enjoyed both commercial and critical success. The performance of Chhabi Biswas as Dada Thakur was much appreciated. It is said that Sarat Pandit himself praised Biswas' portrayal. Biswas' death in a road accident shortly before the film's release undoubtedly played a role in its commercial success. At the 10th National Film Awards, it won the top prize, ahead of the better known films Abhijan, directed by Satyajit Ray, and Sahib Bibi Aur Ghulam, produced by Guru Dutt and directed by Abrar Alvi. It also won a couple of BFJA Awards, including Best Indian Film.

Preservation 
The film has been restored and digitised by the National Film Archive of India.

Awards

10th National Film Awards 
 National Film Award for Best Feature Film

BFJA Awards (1962) 
 Best Indian Films
 Best Audiography - Satyen Chatterjee

References

External links
 

1962 films
Bengali-language Indian films
Indian black-and-white films
1960s Bengali-language films
Indian biographical drama films
Best Feature Film National Film Award winners